Oteyboydak Tleukabyluly (1388–1478), was a Kazakh scientist, healer and author of solid medical-ethnographic works Shipagerlik Bayan. He was familiar with such historical personalities as the 2nd Khan of the Kazakh Khanate Zhanibek Khan and the legendary Kazakh Orator Zhirenshe Chechen.  Tleukabyluly was a well-known public figure, involved in dealing with the plight of the people. The dates of his birth are taken from his book Shipagerlik Bayan. He writes that he started writing this book at the age of 70 at the request of Zhanibek Khan and finished it at the age of 85; after Zhanibek Khan's death. There is also evidence that Oteyboydak died at the age of 90.
He inherited his medical and healer gift from his ancestors. Tleukabyluly devoted his life to treatment and brought traditional (folk) medicine in the academic system. Thus, he was able to raise the medicine of his time at a high level. In this respect, he, like Al-Farabi, despised thirst for fame, wealth, and devoted his life to the study of the peculiarities of healing. 

The book Shipagerlik Bayan has survived until today, thanks to his descendants. But only a fourth part of the rich heritage has survived till today. The rest part was burnt by the Red Guards during the Cultural Revolution in China. This book gives a lot of information on traditional Kazakh medicine. The fact that he used a variety of compounds (mixture), offered over 4000 recipes, convinces us that Oteyboydak was an experienced healer and an outstanding scientist. His book mentions medical properties of 728 kinds of drugs of plant origin, 318 kind of medicine of animal origin, 52 types of medicines derived from metals and metalloids, eight kinds of rare and precious drugs, as well as references to some 500 anatomical terms. It witnesses that the book has the historical-ethnographic importance as well as the depth and richness of the Kazakh language. The book was published in Kazakh language in Cyrillic letters in Urumqi in 1994. Two years later it was published in Almaty, Kazakhstan. The book received the China's National Book award in 1997. Two public medical centers for studying Tleukabyluly's heritage were created in China. Monuments to Tleukabyluly has been erected in Shymkent and on Shalkode Zhailau in Almaty area and one street was named after him in Almaty. Tleukabyluly was not only a scientist-healer but also the visionary thinker, who well knew the life, customs, the world, the spiritual culture of his people. 
He most probably introduced the Jetyata rule to become firm law among Kazakh peoples.

References
Shipagerlik Bayan
Kazakhstan National Encyclopedia, volume 5

External links
Traditional Kazakh Medicine Research Institute of Ili Kazakh Autonomous Prefecture

Ethnic Kazakh people

kk:Өтейбойдақ Тілеуқабылұлы